Dark Mofo is the winter version of the MONA FOMA festival, also held in Tasmania. With many of its events taking place at night, it celebrates the darkness of the southern winter solstice and features many musical acts, large scale light installations and a winter feast. Due to its pagan influence and darker themes, it has been aligned with the Tasmanian Gothic aesthetic in literature and art.

The first Dark Mofo festival was held in 2013 and featured Ryoji Ikeda's 15-kilometre-high light installation Spectra, now a permanent fixture at MONA. The first year also introduced the now annual nude solstice swim that sees over one thousand people dunk in the River Derwent at dawn on the shortest day of the year. Initially the nude swim was banned by police, however the support of politicians and the general public ended with it proceeding and Hobart's mayor Damon Thomas taking part. It has been speculated that this was in fact part of a complicated bet by MONA owner David Walsh, who made his fortune gambling.

Past Dark Mofo line-ups have featured musical acts such as FKA Twigs, Sunn O))), Laurie Anderson, Mogwai, Einstürzende Neubauten, Ulver, Autechre, Merzbow and The Kid Laroi.

The event has courted controversy since its inception, and interstate visitors have noted how different it is to health and safety-obsessed mainland festivals, with one writer calling Dark Mofo "the festival Sydney wouldn't allow." During the inaugural festival, seven people were hospitalised after suffering seizures during Kurt Hentschlager's ZEE, a light installation described as "psychedelic architecture". The exhibit was briefly shut down by the Hobart health authorities. In 2016, a series of artworks were taken down after local art students complained. 2017 saw animal rights activists protest Hermann Nitsch's 150.Action performance piece during which participants writhe in the entrails of a slaughtered bull. The controversy continued in 2018 with petitions from the Australian Christian Lobby and the local Coptic Bishop Anba Suriel calling for the removal of inverted crosses situated around Hobart.  The 2020 festival was ultimately cancelled due to the COVID-19 pandemic. It was expected to return in 2021.

In 2021, Dark Mofo and its creative director Leigh Carmichael were broadly criticised for commissioning the work Union Flag by Spanish artist Santiago Sierra, in which a British flag would be soaked in blood to be donated by Indigenous people from nations colonised by the British Empire. Carmichael initially defended the work, but it was eventually cancelled in response to the criticism.

Awards and nominations

National Live Music Awards
The National Live Music Awards (NLMAs) are a broad recognition of Australia's diverse live industry, celebrating the success of the Australian live scene. The awards commenced in 2016.

|-
| rowspan="2" | National Live Music Awards of 2016
| rowspan="2" | Dark Mofo
| Best Live Music Festival or Event
| 
|-
| Tasmanian Live Event of the Year
| 
|-
| rowspan="2" | National Live Music Awards of 2017
| rowspan="2" | Dark Mofo
| Best Live Music Festival or Event
| 
|-
| Tasmanian Live Event of the Year
| 
|-
| rowspan="2" | National Live Music Awards of 2018
| rowspan="2" | Dark Mofo
| Best Live Music Festival or Event
| 
|-
| Tasmanian Live Event of the Year
| 
|-
| rowspan="2" |  National Live Music Awards of 2019
| rowspan="2"| Dark Mofo
| Best Live Music Festival or Event
| 
|-
| Tasmanian Live Event of the Year
| 
|-

References

External links

2013 establishments in Australia
Arts festivals in Australia
Festivals in Tasmania
Music festivals in Australia
Winter festivals in Australia